Martin Benjamin Benson (10 August 1918 – 28 February 2010) was a British character actor who appeared in films, theatre and television. He appeared in both British and Hollywood productions.

Early life
Benson was born in the East End of London, into a Jewish family, the son of a Russian-Jewish grocer and his Polish-Jewish wife who had left Russia at the revolution. After attending Tottenham Grammar School on a scholarship, he served in the 2nd Searchlight, Royal Artillery, during World War II. Stationed in Cairo, Egypt, he and Arthur Lowe founded the repertory company Mercury Theatre in Alexandria.

Career
He is remembered for his role as the Kralaholme in the original London production of The King and I, a role he recreated in the Oscar-winning film version.

Appearing in films for over six decades, Benson played mostly supporting characters or villains. His films include The Blind Goddess (1948), Wheel of Fate (1953), Interpol (1957), The Strange World of Planet X (1958), Once More, with Feeling! (1959), Exodus (1960), Five Golden Hours (1961), A Shot in the Dark (1964), Pope Joan (1972), The Sea Wolves (1980) and Angela's Ashes (1999).

He also had an uncredited role in MGM's hit historical film, Ivanhoe, and in 1963 he acted in another historic
film, as Ramos in Cleopatra (which also starred Elizabeth Taylor). Benson played both serious roles, such as Ali in Killers of Kilimanjaro (1959) and comic roles, such as Maurice in A Shot in the Dark.

In 1964, he appeared as Mr. Solo, the gangster who is killed by Goldfinger's henchman Oddjob in the James Bond film Goldfinger.

Television
He appeared in many roles on television.   He appeared as a barrister, using his own name, in the unscripted series The Verdict is Yours which ran for several years in the 1950s.   Cases were shown and the previously unknown verdict was given by jury of viewers. In 1957 he made a guest appearance on The Jack Benny Show. In the same year he played the recurring
character the Duke de Medici in the children's adventure series Sword of Freedom. In 1981 he appeared in the television production of The Hitch Hiker's Guide to the Galaxy, albeit unrecognisable under the heavy make-up and costume of Prostetnic Vogon Jeltz, leader of the Vogon fleet sent to
destroy Earth. His last appearance was in the TV series Casualty in 2005.

Death
Benson died in his sleep on 28 February 2010, from natural causes.

Filmography

 Suspected Person (1942) as minor role (uncredited)
 The Blind Goddess (1948) as Count Stephan Mikla
 But Not in Vain (1948) as Mark Meyer
 Trapped by the Terror (1949) as Prison Governor
 Under Capricorn (1949) as Man Carrying Shrunken Head (uncredited)
 The Adventures of PC 49: Investigating the Case of the Guardian Angel (1949) as Skinny Ellis
 I'll Get You for This (1951) as Frankie Sperazza
 Assassin for Hire (1951) as Catesby
 Night Without Stars (1951) as White Cap
 The Dark Light (1951) as Luigi
 Hotel Sahara (1951) as Minor Role (uncredited)
 Mystery Junction (1951) as Steve Harding
 Judgment Deferred (1952) as Pierre Desportes
 The Frightened Man (1952) as Alec Stone
 Wide Boy (1952) as Rocco
 Ivanhoe (1952) as Minor Role (uncredited)
 The Gambler and the Lady (1952) as Tony - Pat's Dance Partner
 Top of the Form (1953) as Cliquot
 Wheel of Fate (1953) as Riscoe
 Recoil (1953) as Farnborough
 Always a Bride (1953) as Hotel Desk Clerk (uncredited)
 Black 13 (1953) as Bruno
 Escape by Night (1953) as Guillio
 You Know What Sailors Are (1954) as Agrarian Officer (uncredited)
 West of Zanzibar (1954) as Dhofar
 Knave of Hearts (1954) as Art (uncredited)
 Passage Home (1955) as Gutierres
 Doctor at Sea (1955) as Head Waiter (uncredited)
 Soho Incident (aka Spin a Dark Web) (1956) as Rico Francesi
 23 Paces to Baker Street (1956) as Pillings
 The King and I (1956) as Kralahome
 Istanbul (1957) as Mr. Darius
 Doctor at Large (1957) as Maharajah of Rhanda
 Interpol (1957) as Captain Varolli
 The Flesh Is Weak (1957) as Angelo Giani
 Man from Tangier (1957) as Voss 
 Windom's Way (1957) as Samcar, Rebel Commander (uncredited)
 The Strange World of Planet X (1958) as Smith
 Sea of Sand (1958) as German Half-track Officer (uncredited)
 The Two-Headed Spy (1958) as Gen. Wagner
 Make Mine a Million (1959) as Chairman
 Killers of Kilimanjaro (1959) as Ali
 Dial 999 (TV series) (Special Branch), episode 13) (1959) as Waymac (filmed 1958)
 Once More, with Feeling! (1960) as Luigi Bardini
 Oscar Wilde (1960) as George Alexander
 Sands of the Desert (1960) as Selim
 The Gentle Trap (1960) as Ricky Barnes
 The 3 Worlds of Gulliver (1960) as Flimnap
 Exodus (1960) as Mordekai
 Gorgo (1961) as Dorkin
 Five Golden Hours (1961) as Enrico
 A Matter of WHO (1961) as Rahman
 The Silent Invasion (1962) as Borge
 Satan Never Sleeps (1962) as Kuznietsky
 Village of Daughters (1962) as 1st Pickpocket
 Captain Clegg (1962) as Mr. Rash (innkeeper)
 I tre nemic (1962) as Prof. Otto Kreutz
 The Fur Collar (1962) as Martin Benson
 Cleopatra (1963) as Ramos
 Mozambique (1964) as Da Silva
 The Secret Door (1964) as Edmundo Vara
 A Shot in the Dark (1964) as Maurice
 Behold a Pale Horse (1964) as Priest
 Goldfinger (1964) as Mr. Solo 
 The Secret of My Success (1965) as Rex Mansard
 A Man Could Get Killed (1966) as Politanu
 The Magnificent Two (1967) as President Diaz
 Battle Beneath the Earth (1967) as Gen. Chan Lu
 Pope Joan (1972) as Lothair
 Tiffany Jones (1973) as Petcek
 The Omen (1976) as Father Spiletto
 Mohammad, Messenger of God (1976) as Abu-Jahal
 Al-risâlah (1976) as Kisra
 Jesus of Nazareth (1977, TV mini-series) as Pharisee
 Meetings with Remarkable Men (1979) as Dr. Ivanov
 The Human Factor (1979) as Boris
 The Sea Wolves (1980) as Mr. Montero
 Sphinx (1981) as Muhammed
 Young Toscanini (1988) as Comparsa (uncredited)
 Capstick's Law (1989) as maitre d'hotel
 The Camomile Lawn (1992) as Pauli Erstweiler 
 Angela's Ashes (1999) as Christian Brother

References

External links

Obituary in The Times
 Martin Benson – Daily Telegraph obituary

1918 births
2010 deaths
Royal Artillery officers
English male film actors
English male television actors
English male stage actors
Jewish English male actors
English people of Russian-Jewish descent
English people of Polish-Jewish descent
Male actors from Buckinghamshire
Male actors from London
People from Markyate
British Army personnel of World War II